Entammede Jimikki Kammal, or simply Jimikki Kammal, is a 2017 song from the soundtrack of the Malayalam film Velipadinte Pusthakam (2017). The song is composed by Shaan Rahman and sung by Vineeth Sreenivasan and Ranjith Unni. Taken from various folk songs, "Jimikki Kammal" is written by Anil Panachooran. The song became popular and produced several dance covers uploaded by fans on YouTube.

Development 

Benny P. Nayarambalam, script writer of Velipadinte Pusthakam, suggested music director Shaan first four lines of the Jimmikki Kammal to compose a similar song. But Benny was reluctant to use the same lines. After composition, lyricist Anil Panachooran and Shaan decided to use the same lines. And director Lal Jose agreed to it. Later Anil added similar folk lines to the song.

Release and Reception 
The song was released as a promo video for the film on 17 August 2017. Instantly, the song became a hit and several dance video covers appeared in YouTube and Facebook. And several among these got viral status.

Most popular dance video was done by a group of teachers and students from Indian School of Commerce, Kochi. This dance video and the two lead dancers, Sheril G Kadavan and Anna George rose into fame instantly. And Sheril even got offers to act in films. Later News Corp bagged the rights to stream this video globally.

Dance cover by Nicole and Sonal from team Naach from Mumbai also became popular. Actor-producer Vijay Babu informed that Sonal and Nichole will do a dance performance in his upcoming production Aadu 2. Another popular video was uploaded by the makers of the film Aadhi. Pranav Mohanlal, Anusree, Aditi Ravi and Linta Jeethu were the dancers in this one.

American actor and television host Jimmy Kimmel tweeted about the song saying that he loved it.

According to Deccan Chronicle, the Song is being included in Kaatrin Mozhi, the Tamil remake of Tumhari Sulu.

References 

2017 songs
Malayalam film songs
Indian songs